Whorf is a surname. Notable people with the surname include:

Benjamin Lee Whorf (1897–1941), American linguist
Richard Whorf (1906–1966), American film director, actor and producer, brother of Benjamin Whorf
Mike Whorf (1932–2020), American radio personality, nephew of Benjamin Whorf

See also
 Worf, a fictional Star Trek character
 Worf (disambiguation)
 Wharf (disambiguation)